Special Operations Command may refer to any of these military or police organizations:

Special Operations Command (Australia)
Special Operations Command (Brazil)
 Special Operations Command (Canada), see Canadian Special Operations Forces Command
 Special Operations Command (Colombia), see Colombian National Police Special Operations Command
Special Operations Command (Denmark)
 Special Operations Command (Germany), see Kommando Spezialkräfte
 Special Operations Command (France), see Commandement des Opérations Spéciales of the French Armed Forces
 Special Operations Command (Greece), see 13th Special Operations Command of the Hellenic Army
Special Operations Command (Indonesia), also known as Komando Operasi Khusus Tentara Nasional Indonesia.
Special Operations Command (Maldives)
Special Operations Command (Malaysia)
Special Operations Component Command (New Zealand)
Special Operations Command (Philippines)
Special Operations Command (Singapore)
Special Operations Command (Spain)
United States Special Operations Command
United States Army Special Operations Command
United States Air Force Special Operations Command
United States Naval Special Warfare Command
United States Marine Corps Forces Special Operations Command
Joint Special Operations Command

See also
 SOC (disambiguation)
 SOCOM (disambiguation)
 Special Forces Command (disambiguation)
 Special Warfare Command (disambiguation)
 Special Operations Group (disambiguation)